Piero Portalupi (1913–1971) was an Italian cinematographer.

Selected filmography
 Luisa Sanfelice (1942)
 Fury (1947)
 Immigrants (1948)
 I cavalieri dalle maschere nere (1948)
 Flying Squadron (1949)
 Altura (1949)
 No Peace Under the Olive Tree (1950)
 Romanzo d'amore (1950)
 Tragic Spell (1951)
 Bellissima (1951)
 Vacation with a Gangster (1951)
 Aida (1953)
 Finishing School (1953)
 Neapolitan Carousel (1954)
 Andrea Chénier (1955)
 The Wolves (1956)
 A Farewell to Arms (1957)
 The Loves of Salammbo (1960)
 Carthage in Flames (1960)
 The Wastrel (1961)
 Francis of Assisi (1961)
 Jessica (1962)
 A Man Named John (1965)
 House of Cards (1968)
 The Biggest Bundle of Them All (1968)
 The Invincible Six (1970)
 Story of a Woman (1970)
 The Statue (1971)
 Romance of a Horsethief (1971)

References

Bibliography 
 Moliterno, Gino. The A to Z of Italian Cinema. Scarecrow Press, 2009.

External links 
 

1913 births
1971 deaths
Italian cinematographers
Film people from Genoa
People from Arquata Scrivia